Kelly Chemane Packard (born January 29, 1975) is an American actress and television personality. She is best known for her roles as Tiffani Smith on California Dreams and April Giminski on Baywatch, as well as co-hosting Ripley's Believe It or Not!. She also co-hosted the late segment of GSN Live from September 15, 2008 until November 28, 2008.

Packard also guest starred in the television series The Wonder Years, Blossom, Step by Step, Boy Meets World, USA High and The Wild Thornberrys.

As a child, she was also a contestant on the Bob Eubanks' daytime version of Card Sharks, during "Young People's Week".

Personal life
Packard joined the Church of Jesus Christ of Latter-day Saints as a teenager. In 1997, she married and was sealed (an LDS rite) to Darrin Privett, an Emergency Medicine physician. They have four children together – three daughters and one son – Aubrey, Dallin, Halle, and Delaney  and live in Newhall, California with their many pets. Packard is an animal lover and a vegetarian. On April 29, 2014, Packard and her family appeared in an episode of Celebrity Wife Swap, in which she switched places with actress Tichina Arnold.

Filmography

Films

Television

References

External links

 
 

Living people
1975 births
20th-century American actresses
21st-century American actresses
Actresses from Los Angeles
American child actresses
American film actresses
American Latter Day Saints
American television actresses
Television personalities from Los Angeles
American women television personalities
Contestants on American game shows
Converts to Mormonism
People from Newhall, Santa Clarita, California